Lousal is a mining village near Grândola.  In 1998, the first Mining Museum in Portugal was founded by a project of Alfredo Tinoco.

References

Villages in Portugal